The White Horse is a grade II listed public house in Whitehorse Lane, Burnham Green, in the parish of Datchworth in Hertfordshire. The building dates from around the seventeenth century. It was formerly known as The Chequers.

References

External links

Grade II listed pubs in Hertfordshire
East Hertfordshire District